is a Japanese actress and singer. She is represented by HiBiKi Cast. She voiced Umi Sonoda in Love Live!, Hikari Kagura in Revue Starlight and Asumi Fuurin / Cure Earth in Healin' Good Pretty Cure. Her nickname is Mimorin.

Biography
Mimori was active in stage musicals under her real name . She met the president of Bushiroad, Takaaki Kidani, during one of her stage musicals which led to her being offered a chance to become a voice actress and auditioning for her first role in 2008. Prior to that, Mimori attended Komazawa University, but dropped out to concentrate on her career. From July to October 2009, she was a member of the singing group Cutie Pai as Suzy (which is the diminutive form of her given name). She appeared on a variety of television series and in musical activities as one of the four lead members of the Milky Holmes voice acting unit, which is named after the series. From 2011 to 2016, Mimori was member of a mini unit in the Love Live! multimedia project, Lily White, alongside Aina Kusuda and Riho Iida. In April 2019, Mimori announced her marriage to New Japan Pro-Wrestling wrestler Kazuchika Okada. In May 2022, it was announced that Mimori was expecting her first child. In August 2022, she gave birth to a baby boy.

Filmography

Anime series

Original video animation

Original net animation

Anime films

Video games

Live-action drama

Dubbing

Discography

Singles

Limited edition singles

Albums

Mini Album

Video

Books

Photo-books
(2013) Mimorinn (Ponikyan Books) (みもりんっ（ぽにきゃんBOOKS) (Pony Canyon, Photographer: Masafumi Nakayama)

References

External links 

  
 
 

1986 births
Living people
Anime singers
Pony Canyon artists
Japanese women pop singers
Japanese musical theatre actresses
Japanese stage actresses
Japanese video game actresses
Japanese voice actresses
Μ's members
Milky Holmes members
Singers from Tokyo
Starlight 99-gumi members
Voice actresses from Tokyo
21st-century Japanese actresses
21st-century Japanese singers
21st-century Japanese women singers